Total war is a type of warfare that includes any and all civilian-associated resources and infrastructure as legitimate military targets, mobilizes all of the resources of society to fight the war, and gives priority to warfare over non-combatant needs.

The term has been defined as "A war that is unrestricted in terms of the weapons used, the territory or combatants involved, or the objectives pursued, especially one in which the laws of war are disregarded."

In the mid-19th century, scholars identified total war as a separate class of warfare. In a total war, the differentiation between combatants and non-combatants diminishes due to the capacity of opposing sides to consider nearly every human, including non-combatants, as resources that are used in the war effort.

Characteristics

According to an analysis by Tiziano Peccia of Stig Förster's works, total war is characterized on four dimensions:

 Total purposes (aim of continuous growth of the power of the parties involved and hegemonic visions);
 Total methods (similar and common methodologies among countries that intend to increase their spheres of influence);
 Total mobilization (inclusion in the conflict of parties not traditionally involved, such as women and children or individuals who are not part of the armed bodies);
 Total control (multisectoral centralization of the powers and orchestration of the activities of the countries in a small circle of dictators or oligarchs, with crossfunctional control over education and culture, media / propaganda, economic and political activities).

Tiziano Peccia adds a fifth dimension to Förster's: "total change". After a total war, the analysis shows that the political, cultural, economic and social assets persist beyond the end of the conflict ("total war is an earthquake that has the world as its epicenter").

Actions that may characterize the post-19th century concept of total war include:
 Strategic bombing, as during World War II, the Korean War, and the Vietnam War (Operations Barrel Roll, Rolling Thunder and Linebacker II)
 Blockade and sieging of population centers, as with the Allied blockade of Germany and the Siege of Leningrad during the First and Second World Wars
 Scorched earth policy, as with the March to the Sea during the American Civil War and the Japanese "Three Alls Policy" during the Second Sino-Japanese War
 Commerce raiding, tonnage war, and unrestricted submarine warfare, as with privateering, the German U-Boat campaigns of the First and Second World Wars, and the United States submarine campaign against Japan during World War II
 Collective punishment, pacification operations, and reprisals against populations deemed hostile, as with the execution and deportation of suspected Communards following the fall of the 1871 Paris Commune or the German reprisal policy targeting resistance movements, insurgents, and Untermenschen such as in France (e.g. Maillé massacre) and Poland during World War II
 Industrial warfare, as with all belligerents in their respective home fronts during World War I and World War II
 The use of civilians and prisoners of war as forced labor for military operations, as with Japan, USSR and Germany's massive use of forced laborers of other nations during World War II (see Slavery in Japan and forced labor under German rule during World War II)
 Giving no quarter (i.e. take no prisoners), as with Hitler's Commando Order during World War II

Background
The phrase "total war" can be traced back to the 1935 publication of German general Erich Ludendorff's World War I memoir, Der totale Krieg ("The total war"). Some authors extend the concept back as far as classic work of Carl von Clausewitz, On War, as "absoluter Krieg" (absolute war), even-though he did not use the term; others interpret Clausewitz differently.  Total war also describes the French "guerre à outrance" during the Franco-Prussian War.

In his December 24, 1864, letter to his chief of staff during the American Civil War, Union general William Tecumseh Sherman wrote the Union was "not only fighting hostile armies, but a hostile people, and must make old and young, rich and poor, feel the hard hand of war, as well as their organized armies," defending Sherman's March to the Sea, the operation that inflicted widespread destruction of infrastructure in Georgia.

United States Air Force General Curtis LeMay updated the concept for the nuclear age. In 1949, he first proposed that a total war in the nuclear age would consist of delivering the entire nuclear arsenal in a single overwhelming blow, going as far as "killing a nation".

History

Middle Ages
Written by academics at Eastern Michigan University, the Cengage Advantage Books: World History textbook claims that while total war "is traditionally associated with the two global wars of the twentieth century... it would seem that instances of total war predate the twentieth century." They write:

18th and 19th centuries

North America
The Sullivan Expedition of 1779 was an example of total warfare. As Native American and Loyalist forces massacred American farmers, killed livestock and burned buildings in remote frontier areas, General George Washington sent General John Sullivan with 4,000 troops to seek "the total destruction and devastation of their settlements" in upstate New York. There was only one small battle as the expedition devastated "14 towns and most flourishing crops of corn."  The Native Americans escaped to Canada where the British fed them; they remained there after the war.

American Civil War
Sherman's March to the Sea in the American Civil War – from November 15, 1864, through December 21, 1864 – is sometimes considered to be an example of total war, for which Sherman used the term hard war. Some historians challenge this designation, as Sherman's campaign assaulted primarily military targets and Sherman ordered his men to spare civilian homes.

Europe
In his book, The First Total War: Napoleon's Europe and the Birth of Warfare as We Know it, David A Bell, a French History professor at Princeton University argues that the French Revolutionary Wars introduced to mainland Europe some of the first concepts of total war, such as mass conscription. He claims that the new republic found itself threatened by a powerful coalition of European nations and used the entire nation's resources in an unprecedented war effort that included levée en masse (mass conscription). By August 23, 1793, the French front line forces grew to some 800,000 with a total of 1.5 million in all services—the first time an army in excess of a million had been mobilized in Western history:

During the Russian campaign of 1812 the Russians retreated while destroying infrastructure and agriculture in order to effectively hamper the French and strip them of adequate supplies. In the campaign of 1813, Allied forces in the German theater alone amounted to nearly one million whilst two years later in the Hundred Days a French decree called for the total mobilization of some 2.5 million men (though at most a fifth of this was managed by the time of the French defeat at Waterloo). During the prolonged Peninsular War from 1808 to 1814 some 300,000 French troops were kept permanently occupied by, in addition to several hundred thousand Spanish, Portuguese and British regulars, an enormous and sustained guerrilla insurgency—ultimately French deaths would amount to 300,000 in the Peninsular War alone.

20th century

World War I

Propaganda

One of the features of total war in Britain was the use of government propaganda posters to divert all attention to the war on the home front. Posters were used to influence public opinion about what to eat and what occupations to take, and to change the attitude of support towards the war effort. Even the Music Hall was used as propaganda, with propaganda songs aimed at recruitment.

After the failure of the Battle of Neuve Chapelle, the large British offensive in March 1915, the British Commander-in-Chief Field Marshal John French blamed the lack of progress on insufficient and poor-quality artillery shells. This led to the Shell Crisis of 1915 which brought down both the Liberal government and Premiership of H. H. Asquith. He formed a new coalition government dominated by Liberals and appointed David Lloyd George as Minister of Munitions. It was a recognition that the whole economy would have to be geared for war if the Allies were to prevail on the Western Front.

Carl Schmitt, a supporter of Nazi Germany, wrote that total war meant "total politics"—authoritarian domestic policies that imposed direct control of the press and economy. In Schmitt's view the total state, which directs fully the mobilization of all social and economic resources to war, is antecedent to total war. Scholars consider that the seeds of this total state concept already existed in the German state of World War I, which exercised full control of the press and other aspects economic and social life as espoused in the statement of state ideology known as the "Ideas of 1914".

Rationing

As young men left the farms for the front, domestic food production in Britain and Germany fell. In Britain, the response was to import more food, which was done despite the German introduction of unrestricted submarine warfare, and to introduce rationing. The Royal Navy's blockade of German ports prevented Germany from importing food and hastened German capitulation by creating a food crisis in Germany.

Almost the whole of Europe and some of the European colonial empires mobilized soldiers. Rationing occurred on the home fronts. Bulgaria went so far as to mobilize a quarter of its population, or 800,000 people, a greater share of its population than any other country during the war.

World War II
The Second World War was the quintessential total war of modernity. The level of national mobilization of resources on all sides of the conflict, the battlespace being contested, the scale of the armies, navies, and air forces raised through conscription, the active targeting of non-combatants (and non-combatant property), the general disregard for collateral damage, and the unrestricted aims of the belligerents marked total war on an unprecedented and unsurpassed, multicontinental scale.

Shōwa Japan

During the first part of the Shōwa era, the government of Imperial Japan launched a string of policies to promote a total war effort against China and occidental powers and increase industrial production. Among these were the National Spiritual Mobilization Movement and the Imperial Rule Assistance Association.

The State General Mobilization Law had fifty clauses, which provided for government controls over civilian organizations (including labor unions), nationalization of strategic industries, price controls and rationing, and nationalized the news media. The laws gave the government the authority to use unlimited budgets to subsidize war production and to compensate manufacturers for losses caused by war-time mobilization. Eighteen of the fifty articles outlined penalties for violators.

To improve its production, Shōwa Japan used millions of slave laborers and pressed more than 18 million people in East Asia into forced labor.

United Kingdom

Before the onset of the Second World War, Great Britain drew on its First World War experience to prepare legislation that would allow immediate mobilization of the economy for war, should future hostilities break out. Rationing of most goods and services was introduced, not only for consumers but also for manufacturers. This meant that factories manufacturing products that were irrelevant to the war effort had more appropriate tasks imposed. All artificial light was subject to legal blackouts.

Not only were men conscripted into the armed forces from the beginning of the war (something which had not happened until the middle of World War I), but women were also conscripted as Land Girls to aid farmers and the Bevin Boys were conscripted to work down the coal mines.

Enormous casualties were expected in bombing raids, so children were evacuated from London and other cities en masse to the countryside for compulsory billeting in households. In the long term this was one of the most profound and longer-lasting social consequences of the whole war for Britain. This is because it mixed up children with adults of other classes. Not only did the middle and upper classes become familiar with the urban squalor suffered by working class children from the slums, but the children got a chance to see animals and the countryside, often for the first time, and experience rural life.

The use of statistical analysis, by a branch of science which has become known as Operational Research to influence military tactics, was a departure from anything previously attempted. It was a very powerful tool but it further dehumanised war particularly when it suggested strategies that were counter-intuitive. Examples, where statistical analysis directly influenced tactics include the work done by Patrick Blackett's team on the optimum size and speed of convoys and the introduction of bomber streams, by the Royal Air Force to counter the night fighter defences of the Kammhuber Line.

Germany

In 1935 General Ludendorff in the book Der Totale Krieg gave life to the term "Total War" in the German lexicon.

In contrast, Germany started the war under the concept of Blitzkrieg. Officially, it did not accept that it was in a total war until Joseph Goebbels' Sportpalast speech of 18 February 1943 – in which the crowd was told "Totaler Krieg – Kürzester Krieg" ("Total War – Shortest War”.)

Goebbels and Hitler had spoken in March 1942 about Goebbels' idea to put the entire home front on a war footing. Hitler appeared to accept the concept, but took no action. Goebbels had the support of minister of armaments Albert Speer, economics minister Walther Funk and Robert Ley, head of the German Labour Front, and they pressed Hitler in October 1942 to take action, but Hitler, while outwardly agreeing, continued to dither. Finally, after the holidays in 1942, Hitler sent his powerful personal secretary, Martin Bormann, to discuss the question with Goebbels and Hans Lammers, the head of the Reich Chancellery.  As a result, Bormann told Goebbels to go ahead and draw up a draft of the necessary decree, to be signed in January 1943. Hitler signed the decree on 13 January, almost a year after Goebbels first discussed the concept with him. The decree set up a steering committee consisting of Bormann, Lammers, and General Wilhelm Keitel to oversee the effort, with Goebbels and Speer as advisors; Goebbels had expected to be one of the triumvirate.  Hitler remained aloof from the project, and it was Goebbels and Hermann Göring who gave the "total war" radio address from the Sportspalast the next month, on the 10th anniversary of the Nazi's "seizure of power".

The commitment to the doctrine of the short war was a continuing handicap for the Germans; neither plans nor state of mind were adjusted to the idea of a long war until the failure of the Operation Barbarossa. A major strategic defeat in the Battle of Moscow forced Speer as armaments minister to nationalize German war production and eliminate the worst inefficiencies.

Under Speer's direction a threefold increase in armament production occurred and did not reach its peak until late 1944. To do this during the damage caused by the growing strategic Allied bomber offensive, is an indication of the degree of industrial under-mobilization in the earlier years. It was because the German economy through most of the war was substantially under-mobilized that it was resilient under air attack. Civilian consumption was high during the early years of the war and inventories both in industry and in consumers' possession were high. These helped cushion the economy from the effects of bombing.

Plant and machinery were plentiful and incompletely used, thus it was comparatively easy to substitute unused or partly used machinery for that which was destroyed. Foreign labour, both slave labour and labour from neighbouring countries who joined the Anti-Comintern Pact with Germany, was used to augment German industrial labour which was under pressure by conscription into the Wehrmacht (Armed Forces).

Canada 

In Canada early use of the term concerned whether or not the country was committing enough to mobilizing its resources, rather than whether or not to target civilians of the enemy countries.  During the early days of the Second World War, whether or not Canada was committed to a "total war effort" was point of partisan political debate between the governing Liberals and the opposition Conservatives.  The Conservatives elected as their national leader Arthur Meighen, who had been the cabinet minister responsible for implementing conscription during the First World War, and advocated for conscription again.  Prime Minister W.L. Mackenzie King argued that Canada could still be said to have a "total war effort" without conscription, and delivered nationally-broadcast speeches to this effect 1942.  Meighen failed to win his seat in by-election in 1942, and the issue subsided for a short time.  But eventually, national conscription was introduced in Canada in 1944, as well as dramatically increased taxation, another symbol of the "total war effort".

Soviet Union

The Soviet Union (USSR) was a command economy which already had an economic and legal system allowing the economy and society to be redirected into fighting a total war. The transportation of factories and whole labour forces east of the Urals as the Germans advanced across the USSR in 1941 was an impressive feat of planning. Only those factories which were useful for war production were moved because of the total war commitment of the Soviet government.

The Eastern Front of the European Theatre of World War II encompassed the conflict in central and eastern Europe from June 22, 1941, to May 9, 1945. It was the largest theatre of war in history in terms of numbers of soldiers, equipment and casualties and was notorious for its unprecedented ferocity, destruction, and immense loss of life (see World War II casualties). The fighting involved millions of German, Hungarian, Romanian and Soviet troops along a broad front hundreds of kilometres long. It was by far the deadliest single theatre of World War II. Scholars now believe that at most 27 million Soviet citizens died during the war, including at least 8.7 million soldiers who fell in battle against Hitler's armies or died in POW camps. Millions of civilians died from starvation, exposure, atrocities, and massacres. The Axis lost over 5 million soldiers in the east as well as many thousands of civilians.

During the Battle of Stalingrad, newly built T-34 tanks were driven—unpainted because of a paint shortage—from the factory floor straight to the front. This came to symbolise the USSR's commitment to a policy of total war.

United States

The United States underwent an unprecedented mobilization of national resources for the Second World War. Although the United States was not in danger of an existential attack, the national sense after Pearl Harbor was to use all the nation's resources to defeat Germany and Japan. Most non-essential activities were rationed, prohibited or restrained, and most of the fit unmarried young men were drafted. There was little urgency before 1940, when the collapse of France ended the Phoney War and revealed urgent needs. Nevertheless President Franklin Roosevelt moved to first solidify public opinion before acting. In 1940 the first peacetime draft was instituted, along with Lend-Lease programs to aid the British, and covert aid was passed to the Chinese as well.
American public opinion was still opposed to involvement in the problems of Europe and Asia, however. In 1941, the Soviet Union became the latest nation to be invaded, and the U.S. gave its aid as well. American ships began defending aid convoys to the Allied nations against submarine attacks, and a total trade embargo against the Empire of Japan was instituted to deny its military the raw materials its factories and military forces required to continue its offensive actions in China.

In late 1941, Japan's Army-dominated government decided to seize by military force the strategic resources of South-East Asia and Indonesia since the Western powers would not give Japan these goods by trade. Planning for this action included surprise attacks on American and British forces in Hong Kong, the Philippines, Malaya, and the U.S. naval base and warships at Pearl Harbor. In response to these attacks, the U.K. and U.S. declared war the next day. Nazi Germany declared war on the U.S. a few days later, along with Fascist Italy; the U.S. found itself fully involved in a second world war.

As the United States began to gear up for a major war, information and propaganda efforts were set in motion. Civilians (including children) were encouraged to take part in fat, grease, and scrap metal collection drives. Many factories making non-essential goods retooled for war production. Levels of industrial productivity previously unheard of were attained during the war; multi-thousand-ton convoy ships were routinely built in a month and a half, and tanks poured out of the former automobile factories. Within a few years of the U.S. entry into the Second World War, nearly every man without children fit for service, between 18 and 30, was conscripted into the military "for the duration" of the conflict, and unprecedented numbers of women took up jobs previously held by them. Strict systems of rationing of consumer staples were introduced to redirect productive capacity to war needs.

Previously untouched sections of the nation mobilized for the war effort. Academics became technocrats; home-makers became bomb-makers (massive numbers of women worked in industry during the war); union leaders and businessmen became commanders in the massive armies of production. The great scientific communities of the United States were mobilized as never before, and mathematicians, doctors, engineers, and chemists turned their minds to the problems ahead of them.

By the war's end, a multitude of advances had been made in medicine, physics, engineering, and the other sciences. This included the efforts of the theoretical physicists working at the Los Alamos National Laboratory on the Manhattan Project, which led to the Trinity nuclear test and thus brought about the Atomic Age.

In the war, the United States lost 407,316 military personnel, but had managed to avoid the extensive level of damage to civilian and industrial infrastructure that other participants suffered. The U.S. emerged as one of the two superpowers after the war.

Unconditional surrender

After the United States entered World War II, Franklin D. Roosevelt declared at Casablanca conference to the other Allies and the press that unconditional surrender was the objective of the war against the Axis Powers of Germany, Italy, and Japan. Prior to this declaration, the individual regimes of the Axis Powers could have negotiated an armistice similar to that at the end of World War I and then a conditional surrender when they perceived that the war was lost.

The unconditional surrender of the major Axis powers caused a legal problem at the post-war Nuremberg Trials, because the trials appeared to be in conflict with Articles 63 and 64 of the Geneva Convention of 1929. Usually if such trials are held, they would be held under the auspices of the defeated power's own legal system as happened with some of the minor Axis powers, for example in the post World War II Romanian People's Tribunals. To circumvent this, the Allies argued that the major war criminals were captured after the end of the war, so they were not prisoners of war and the Geneva Conventions did not cover them. Further, the collapse of the Axis regimes created a legal condition of total defeat (debellatio) so the provisions of the 1907 Hague Convention over military occupation were not applicable.

Post-World War II

Since the end of World War II, no industrial nation has fought such a large, decisive war. This is likely due to the availability of nuclear weapons, whose destructive power and quick deployment render a full mobilization of a country's resources such as in World War II logistically impractical and strategically irrelevant.

By the end of the 1950s, the ideological stand-off of the Cold War between the Western world and the Soviet Union had resulted in thousands of nuclear weapons being aimed by each side at the other. Strategically, the equal balance of destructive power possessed by each side manifests in the doctrine of mutually assured destruction (MAD), which determines that a nuclear attack by one superpower would result in a nuclear counter-strike by the other. This would result in hundreds of millions of deaths in a world where, in words widely attributed to Nikita Khrushchev, "The living will envy the dead".

During the Cold War, the two superpowers sought to avoid open conflict between their respective forces, as both sides recognized that such a clash could very easily escalate, and quickly involve nuclear weapons. Instead, the superpowers fought each other through their involvement in proxy wars, military buildups, and diplomatic standoffs.

In the case of proxy wars, each superpower supported its respective allies in conflicts with forces aligned with the other superpower, such as in the Vietnam War and the Soviet invasion of Afghanistan.

During the Yugoslav Wars, NATO conducted strikes against the electrical grid in enemy territory using graphite bombs. NATO claimed that the objective of their strikes was to disrupt military infrastructure and communications.

The Royal United Services Institute  has argued that the Russian Invasion of Ukraine can be seen as the first total war since the end of World War II.

See also

 The bomber will always get through
 Conventional warfare
 Economic warfare
 Industrial warfare
 Roerich Pact
 Total defence
 War crime
 War economy
 War of annihilation
 World war

References
Notes

Bibliography
 Barnhart, Michael A. Japan prepares for total war: The search for economic security, 1919–1941 (Cornell UP, 2013).
 
 Barrett, John G. "Sherman and Total War in the Carolinas." North Carolina Historical Review 37.3 (1960): 367-381. online
 
 Black, Jeremy. The age of total war, 1860–1945 (Rowman & Littlefield Publishers, 2010).
 Broers, Michael. "The Concept of Total War in the Revolutionary – Napoleonic Period." War in History 15.3 (2008): 247–68.
 Craig, Campbell. Glimmer of a new Leviathan: Total war in the realism of Niebuhr, Morgenthau, and Waltz (Columbia University Press, 2004), Intellectual history.
 
 Fisher, Noel C. "'Prepare Them For My Coming': General William T. Sherman, Total War, and Pacification in West Tennessee." Tennessee Historical Quarterly 51.2 (1992): 75-86.
 Förster, Stig, and Jorg Nagler. On the Road to Total War: The American Civil War and the German Wars of Unification, 1861–1871 (Cambridge University Press, 2002).
 Hewitson, Mark. "Princes’ Wars, Wars of the People, or Total War? Mass Armies and the Question of a Military Revolution in Germany, 1792–1815." War in History 20.4 (2013): 452–90.
 Hoffman, Christopher S. Major General William T. Sherman's total war in the Savannah and Carolina campaigns (US Army Command and General Staff College, School for Advanced Military Studies Fort Leavenworth, 2018) online.

 Hsieh, Wayne Wei-Siang. "Total War and the American Civil War Reconsidered: The End of an Outdated" Master Narrative"." Journal of the Civil War Era 1.3 (2011): 394-408. online

 
 Marwick, Arthur, Clive Emsley, and Wendy Simpson. Total war and historical change: Europe 1914–1955 (Open University Press, 2001).
 
 Royster, Charles. The Destructive War: William Tecumseh Sherman, Stonewall Jackson, and the Americans (1993)

 
 Walters, John Bennett. "General William T. Sherman and total war." journal of Southern history 14.4 (1948): 447-480. online
 Walters, John Bennett. Merchant of terror: General Sherman and total war (1973); adds nothing new says John F. Marszalek, Journal of American History (Dec., 1974), pp. 784-785.

External links
 Israel's 1948 War of Independence as a Total War
 A collection of papers relating to the Sullivan Expedition
 Daniel Marc Segesser: Controversy: Total War, in: 1914-1918-online. International Encyclopedia of the First World War.

Wars by type
Warfare by type
Military doctrines
Economic warfare
Military economics
Military science